Lucia Maria Perillo (September 30, 1958 – October 16, 2016) was an American poet.

In 2000, Perillo was recognized with a "genius grant" as part of the MacArthur Fellows Program.

Life and career
Perillo was born in Manhattan on September 30, 1958 and grew up in Irvington.

Her work appeared in The New Yorker, The Atlantic and The Kenyon Review, among other magazines. A traditional poet of mostly free-verse personal reflection, she wrote extensively about living with multiple sclerosis in her poems and essays. Time Will Clean the Carcass Bones was her last book of poetry (Copper Canyon Press, 2016). Her 2012 collection of short fiction, Happiness is a Chemical in the Brain, was shortlisted for the 2013 PEN/Robert W. Bingham Prize. She died on October 16, 2016 in Olympia, Washington, aged 58.

Awards
1989 Samuel French Morse Award, Northeastern University Press
1990 Norma Farber First Book Award, Poetry Society of America for Dangerous Life
1991 PEN/Revson Award, Pen American Center, NY
Purdue University's Emery Poetry Prize
1993 Illinois Arts Council Award for Creative Non-Fiction
1994 Finalist, National Poetry Series
1995 Verna Emery Poetry Prize, Purdue University Press
1995 Iowa Poetry Prize
1997 Kate Tufts Discovery Award
1997 Balcones Prize, Austin Community College for The Body Mutinies
1998 Chad Walsh Poetry Prize, The Beloit Poetry Journal
1998 Pushcart Prize for "Bad Boy Number Seventeen"
2000 MacArthur Fellows Program award
2003 Pushcart Prize for "Shrike Tree"
2005 Pushcart Prize for "In the Confessional Mode"
2006 Finalist, Los Angeles Times Book Prize
2010 Washington State Book Award for Inseminating the Elephant
2010 Bobbit Prize, Library of Congress for Inseminating the Elephant
2010 Pulitzer Prize in Poetry finalist for Inseminating the Elephant
2012 WA State Governor's Arts Medal
2012 Frank O'Connor International Short Story Award finalist for Happiness is a Chemical in the Brain
2013 PEN/Robert W. Bingham Prize finalist for Happiness is a Chemical in the Brain
2013 National Book Critics Circle Award finalist in Poetry for On the Spectrum of Possible Deaths
2013 Shelley Memorial Award
2013 Pacific Northwest Booksellers Association Award for On the Spectrum of Possible Deaths

Bibliography

Poetry
Collections
 
 
 
 
 
 
 Time Will Clean the Carcass Bones. Copper Canyon Press. 2016. 

List of poems

Non-fiction

Fiction

References

External links
Poetry.LA's video of Lucia Perillo's reading at Boston Court Performing Arts Center, Pasadena CA, 3/08/2010

1958 births
2016 deaths
American women poets
American writers of Italian descent
MacArthur Fellows
McGill University alumni
The New Yorker people
People from Irvington, New York
Poets from New York (state)
Saint Martin's University faculty
Southern Illinois University Carbondale faculty
Syracuse University alumni
Writers from Olympia, Washington
American women academics
21st-century American women